Cecil Dowdy (May 9, 1945 – November 24, 2002) was an American college football player and businessman. He played offensive tackle for the University of Alabama Crimson Tide from 1964 through 1966. He was a member of both the 1964 and 1965 national championship teams. Dowdy was also a unanimous selection to the 1966 College Football All-America Team.

Playing career

College
After a successful high school playing career at Cherokee Vocational High School that culminated with his selection to the 16th annual AHSAA All-Star Game in 1963, Dowdy enrolled at the University of Alabama with an athletic scholarship to play on the football team. After he played on the freshman football squad for the 1963 season, Dowdy stated as an offensive tackle for the three years that followed. Over those three seasons, Alabama amassed an overall record of 30 wins, two losses and one tie (30–2–1) and won three Southeastern Conference (SEC) championships and two national championships.

In recognition for his play on the field, Dowdy was recognized as a unanimous selection to the 1966 College Football All-America Team as an offensive tackle. He was also awarded the Jacobs Blocking Trophy in 1966 as the best blocker in the SEC as selected by the coaches.

Professional
Dowdy was selected in the ninth round (230th overall) of the 1967 NFL Draft by the Cleveland Browns. After a single season with the Browns that saw little playing time, Dowdy was traded to the Los Angeles Rams before the 1968 season, where he was a member of their practice squad. In April 1969, Dowdy signed with the Saskatchewan Roughriders of the Canadian Football League. He was later waived by the team in July 1969.

Death
Dowdy died on November 24, 2002, at Helena, Arkansas at the age of 57. His death was ruled accidental as his shotgun discharged and hit him in his lower jaw when he was retrieving a duck he hit during a hunting trip at Lambrook, Arkansas. He was pronounced dead at 11:45 a.m at Helena Regional Medical Center.

References

1945 births
2002 deaths
People from Colbert County, Alabama
Players of American football from Alabama
American football offensive tackles
All-American college football players
Alabama Crimson Tide football players
Cleveland Browns players
Los Angeles Rams players
Saskatchewan Roughriders players
Hunting accident deaths
Accidental deaths in Arkansas
Deaths by firearm in Arkansas
Firearm accident victims in the United States